Andreas Kappeler (born 1943) is a Swiss historian. He is professor emeritus for the history of Eastern Europe at the University of Vienna.

Life 
Kappeler was born in Winterthur, Switzerland on September 20, 1943. From 1962 to 1969 he studied history, slavistics, publizistik (roughly communication science) and history of Eastern Europe at the universities of Zurich and Vienna.

Academic research 
Kappeler's research focus is the Russia of the modern era with a special focus on the different nationalities of the pre-modern Tsarist Empire, with social historical issues being the focus of his interest. He is considered a specialist in the history of Muslims in Russia and Central Asia. As one of the first historians in the German-speaking world, he began dealing with the History of Ukraine as early as the 1980s. After his appointment to the University of Vienna, he increasingly included the former Habsburg areas of today's Ukraine (Galicia) in his research. In 2017, he noted that the West had erroneously "adopted the Russian perspective, which has had the prerogative of interpretation for two centuries," in matters relating to the nations surrounding Ukraine.

References

External links 
 Official page at the University of Vienna

1943 births
Living people
21st-century Swiss historians
21st-century Swiss male writers
20th-century Swiss historians
20th-century Swiss male writers
Historians of Eastern Europe